Santiago Manguán (25 July 1941 – 30 January 2022) was a Spanish long-distance runner. He competed in the marathon at the 1976 Summer Olympics. Manguán died in Burgos on 30 January 2022, at the age of 80.

References

1941 births
2022 deaths
Athletes (track and field) at the 1976 Summer Olympics
Spanish male long-distance runners
Spanish male marathon runners
Olympic athletes of Spain
Sportspeople from the Province of Burgos
Place of birth missing